Ma Ju-lung was a Chinese Muslim general of the 36th Division (National Revolutionary Army), who served under Generals Ma Zhongying and Ma Hushan. He commanded the 1st Brigade.

References

External links 
Flags of Independence

Hui people
Warlords in Republican China
Chinese Muslim generals
National Revolutionary Army generals from Gansu
Possibly living people
Xinjiang Wars